The Dangerous Affair is a 2015 Chinese suspense thriller film directed by Zeyan Wang. The film was released on October 16, 2015.

Cast
Zhou Jie
Lawrence Ng
Qi Cheng
Chao Guo
Yu Wang
Minqiang Jin

Reception
The film has earned  at the Chinese box office.

References

2010s thriller films
Chinese thriller films
Chinese suspense films